Kenny Belaey (born 26 January 1983, in Eeklo, Belgium) is a Belgian mountain bike trials cyclist. He holds the UCI record of most podium spots at a world championship in the discipline of trial.

Thanks to his titles, professionalism, style and ability to interact with the crowd Belaey is one of the biggest names in the bike trials world scene. The Belgian has been at the cutting edge of his sport for more than ten year now, achieving his first 26 inch UCI Elite crown in 2002.

Kenny is always proactive in promoting his sponsors and his sport as well. The last couple of years Kenny has been traveling extensively to perform shows all over the world, making appearances on TV and working with photographers and journalists to create trial features for the world’s leading bike and sports magazines.

History

Belaey started in competition in 1992, inspired by his dad Ronny who was a motorcycle trialist.  Hard work, athletic skills and fierce natural talent started to pay off soon. In 1996 he made his international debut in Spa-Francorchamps coming home fifth. Another two year later (1998) he claimed his first cadet world champion title. He wrote history in 2000 when he won the Junior Worlds in both 20” and 26”.  Kenny continued to make a name for himself by dominating the 2005 and 2006 seasons, taking back-to-back world titles. He even made it a "triple" in 2005 racking up the World, European and World Cup overall titles. His ability to clear seemingly impossible obstacles and pull off amazing saves has earned him the nickname "The Magician".

Titles 
 UCI Cadet World Champion: 1998
 BIU Cadet World Champion: 1999 
 Junior World Champion: 2000 (20" & 26" on same day), 2001
 Junior European Champion: 2000
 Elite World Champion: 2002, 2005, 2006, 2010
 Elite World Cup Winner: 2000, 2003, 2004, 2005, 2007, 2009
 Elite European Champion: 2005, 2006, 2011

For the sport

More than anyone he’s pushing to help developing the sport and reaching a more mainstream audience. Early on in 2009 Belaey has set off on a five-week global trek crossing from Spain to England, Cleveland, California and Hawaii in the US. His encounters with biking legends places and athletes influencing the sport will be the backbone of a forthcoming TV series to be aired on the ‘Extreme Sports Channel’. Featured sporting celebrities include: Toni Bou (moto trials star), Dave Mirra (X-games BMX legend), Hans Rey and Ot Pi (bike trials pioneers), Danny Macaskill (Scottish street riding ace) and many more.
In 2011 the 4th and 5th episode will go on air for Belgian TV and the Extreme Sportschannel, showcasing his adventures during a road trip through South Africa.
In 2011 he also decided to organize the UCI world cup rounds in Belgium, having the biggest media outcome in the history of the sport with live international TV coverage…
In the years that follow he spends a lot of time in the USA and it's in 2018 that founds women shred, a women focused MTB event. 1 year later in 2019 he founds the Bentonville Bike Fest, an all inclusive bike festival with close to 20.000 visitors. A festival that champions the MTB capital of the world in Northwest Arkansas!

Personal life
Belaey enjoys playing the guitar, listening to music, watching movies, fishing, and snowboarding. He is married to Barbara Matthys and together they have a son named Cesar Belaey.

References

External links
 Kenny Belaey - Official website
 Kenny Belaey's Bigtime
 @belaeykenny - Official twitter

Living people
1983 births
Mountain bike trials riders
UCI Mountain Bike World Champions (men)
Cyclists from East Flanders
People from Eeklo
Belgian male cyclists